Birlec Ltd. was an English manufacturer of industrial electric furnaces. Birlec was founded in 1927, as the Birmingham Electric Furnace Company, establishing a factory at Tyburn Road, Erdington, Birmingham. In 1954, Birlec's owner the Mond Nickel Company sold the company to Associated Electrical Industries. As part of its expansion plans, AEI relocated Birlec to a new factory at Aldridge, Staffordshire during the late 1950s. Some of the largest electric arc furnaces produced by Birlec had a smelting capacity of over 100 tons. Birlec along with the rest of AEI, was taken over by GEC in 1967.

References

External links
 http://www.gracesguide.co.uk/Birmingham_Electric_Furnaces

Engineering companies of England
Defunct manufacturing companies of the United Kingdom
Companies based in Staffordshire
General Electric Company
Associated Electrical Industries
1927 establishments in England
Manufacturing companies established in 1927
1967 disestablishments in England
Manufacturing companies disestablished in 1967